Angela Zachepa-Muluzi (born c. 1983) is a Malawian accountant and politician. She is the former Member of Parliament for Blantyre North East. In 2004, Zachepa was elected as a Member of Parliament in  Malawi at age 21, making her the youngest Member of Parliament ever in Malawi and a baby of the house.

She lost the seat in 2009 to Cecelia Chanzama, the results of which were being disputed and as Zachepa noted: “We want the truth and justice”.

She has a bachelor's degree in Accounting from the University of Malawi, Polytechnic. She is married to Austin Muluzi. She is the daughter-in-law of former Malawian President Bakili Muluzi.

References

Members of the National Assembly (Malawi)
1980s births
Malawian accountants
Living people
Malawian women in politics
21st-century women politicians